Diuris decrementa, commonly called the common bee orchid, is a species of orchid which is endemic to the south-west of Western Australia. It is similar to the bee orchid (Diuris laxiflora) but its flowers are smaller and on a shorter flowering stem.

Description
The flowers have broad, ear-like petals, an erect, tapering dorsal sepal and narrow, forward-projecting lateral sepals. The labellum has three lobes, the lateral ones small and spreading, and the middle lobe elongated with a raised mid-line. Flowering occurs from late August to early November.

Taxonomy and naming
Diuris decrementa was first formally described in 2013 by David Jones and Christopher French and the description was published in Australian Orchid Review. The specific epithet (decrementa) is derived from the Latin word decrementum meaning "lessening" referring to the small flowers and shorter flowering stem of this species.

Distribution and habitat
The common bee orchid occurs from near Perth to the east of Esperance where it grows in a range of habitats from woodlands to soil pockets on granite outcrops.

Conservation
Diuris decrementa is classified as "not threatened" by the Western Australian Government Department of Parks and Wildlife.

References

decrementa
Endemic orchids of Australia
Orchids of Western Australia
Endemic flora of Western Australia
Plants described in 2013